Ennodius is a genus of leaf beetles in the subfamily Eumolpinae. It is known from Africa.

Species
 Ennodius caeruleus (Pic, 1952)
 Ennodius murrayi (Chapuis, 1874)
 Ennodius orientalis Kuntzen, 1912

References

Eumolpinae
Chrysomelidae genera
Beetles of Africa
Taxa named by Édouard Lefèvre